Kutawikucu Resaru, better known as Hawk Chief (1853–1895), was a Pawnee Scout for the United States Army. He is best known for running the first sub-four minute mile during his time in service. His run is not largely chronicled, because many believe the credit for the historic first sub-four mile belongs to another man. Hawk Chief was a citizen of the Pawnee Nation, and served in the Plains Indian Wars as a Pawnee Scout. His legacy as "the fastest man alive" is one shrouded in controversy despite first hand accounts of his run.

Early life 
While little is known about Hawk Chief's childhood, there are documents that tell us his birth name and year, as well as the year of his death. Kutawikucu  Resaru, the name given to Hawk Chief, was born in 1853. He died at the age of 42 in 1895. As a Čawî’ Pawnee he was born in the South Band town where Lashara, Nebraska now sits. Despite the lack of information surrounding his early life, it is known that he joined the armed forces to be a runner.

Career 
Native Americans were an important part of the American military, even since its begininning. Many of these natives were employed or recruited in order to help assist in colonist/ American conflicts with other Native Americans. Native scouts and runners were at their heights during "instances as the Pequot War from 1634–1638, the Revolutionary War, as well as in War of 1812."  Some, such as Hawk Chief, even served during the Plains Indian Wars. He enlisted in the Pawnee Scout Battalion in 1876. Although they peaked early on, the use of Indian scouts ended in the year 1947, with the retirement of the last active scout.

During his time as a Pawnee runner, Hawk Chief became the first person documented to run a sub-four-minute mile. The details of the event, as chronicled by Army Officer, Captain Luther North, clocked the mile at 3 minutes and 58 seconds. In his account, North describes the event."Black Hawk Chief...  one of my favorites, was the fastest runner in the tribe, and I believe the world... while at Sidney after coming down from the Dull Knife expedition, another man and I timed him, both with stop watches. He ran the first half in 2 minutes flat and the second in 1:58 or the mile in 3.58 – so much faster than ever done before that we didn’t believe the track was right, and had it measured with a steal  tape. I had him run again. To this day [written in 1930] no man has ever equaled it―my reason for believing that he was the fastest man on his feet. The army stripped him and went carefully over him, stating afterward that Hawk Chief was the most perfect specimen of man he had ever seen." North's account of the event serves as a primary source on an event whose significance is often disputed. In having an official report of such a major event, North's retelling of the event is able to serve as proof that Hawk Chief was indeed the first man to run a sub-four-minute mile.

Controversy 
Despite having accounts of his historic run, Hawk Chief is not always credited as having been the first man to run mile in less than four minutes. This honor is often accredited to British athlete Roger Bannister. He ran his own sub-four mile at a track meet at Oxford, clocking his time at 3 minutes, 59.4 seconds on May 6, 1954. While nobody refutes the fact that he did run a sub-four minute mile, he is almost always accredited as having been the first to do so. Over time, the importance and significance of Hawk Chief's run has been forgotten, despite having immortalized accounts of the moment.

Legacy 
His identity as a Native American, and the ways in which his achievements are ignored, haven largely impacted the involvement of Natives in sports. Native American athletes are frequently passed over, mostly due to the lack of information accessible on them.

References 

1853 births
1890s deaths
Pawnee people
American male middle-distance runners
American male long-distance runners